The Ibans or Sea Dayaks are a branch of the Dayak people on the island of Borneo in Southeast Asia. It is believed that the term "Iban" was originally from the Iban Language. "Iban" means human or person.

Ibans were renowned for practicing headhunting and tribal/territorial expansion, and had a fearsome reputation as a strong and successful warring tribe in the past. Since the arrival of Europeans and the subsequent colonisation of the area, headhunting gradually faded out of practice although many other tribal customs and practices as well as the Iban language continue to thrive. The Iban population is concentrated in Brunei, the Indonesian province of West Kalimantan and the Malaysian state of Sarawak. They traditionally live in longhouses called rumah panjai in Sarawak or betang (trunk) in West Kalimantan, because the jointed family rooms are built by jointing the tree trunks from base to tip to the left and right of the middle headman's room, which symbolizes a tree with a branch on the left and right side.

Religion and belief

For hundreds of years, the ancestors of the Iban practiced animistic beliefs, although after the arrival of James Brooke, many were influenced by European missionaries and converted to Christianity. Although the majority are now Christian; many continue to observe both Christian and traditional ceremonies, particularly during marriages or festivals, although some ancestral practice such as 'Miring' are still prohibited by certain churches. After being Christianized, the majority of Iban people have changed their traditional name to a Hebrew-based "Christian name" such as David, Christopher, Janet, Magdalene, Peter or Joseph, but a minority still maintain their traditional Iban name or a combination of both with the first Christian name followed by a second traditional Iban name such as David Dunggau, Kenneth Kanang, Christopher Changgai, Janet Jenna or Joseph Jelenggai.

The longhouses of Iban Dayaks are constructed in such a way as to act as an accommodation and a religious place of worship. The entire structure is built as a standing tree when viewed along its length or sideways. The open veranda is exposed to sunrise, thus facing to the east and the sunset is the back of the longhouse.

Iban religion and pantheon 
Among Iban Dayaks, their belief and way of life can be simply called the Iban religion as per Jenson's book with the same title and has been written by Benedict Sandin and others extensively. It is characterized by a supreme being in the name of Bunsu (Kree) Petara who has no parents and creates everything in this world and other worlds. Under Bunsu Petara are the seven gods whose names are: Sengalang Burong as the god of war and healing, Biku Bunsu Petara as the high priest and second in command, Menjaya as the first shaman (manang) and god of medicine, Selampandai as the god of creation, Sempulang Gana as the god of agriculture and land along with Semarugah, Ini Inda/Inee/Andan as the naturally born doctor and god of justice and Anda Mara as the god of wealth.

The life actions and decision-making processes of Iban Dayaks depend on divination, augury, and omens. They have several methods to receive omens where omens can be obtained by deliberate seeking or chance encounters. The first method is via dream to receive charms, amulets ( or medicine and a curse from any gods, people of Panggau Libau and Gelong, and any spirits or ghosts. The second method is via animal omens (burong laba) which have long-lasting effects such as from deer barking which is quite random in nature. The third method is via bird omens (burong bisa) which have short-term effects that are commonly limited to a certain farming year or a certain activity at hand. The fourth method is via pig liver divination after festival celebration At the end of critical festivals, the divination of the pig liver will be interpreted to forecast the outcome of the future or the luck of the individual who holds the festival.

There are seven omen birds under the charge of their chief Sengalang Burong at their longhouse named Tansang Kenyalang (Hornbill Abode), which are Ketupong (Jaloh or Kikeh or Entis) (Rufous Piculet) as the first in command, Beragai (Scarlet-rumped trogon), Pangkas (Maroon Woodpecker) on the righthand side of Sengalang Burong's family room while Bejampong (Crested Jay) as the second in command, Embuas (Banded Kingfisher), Kelabu Papau (Senabong) (Diard's Trogon) and Nendak (White-rumped shama) on the lefthand side. The calls and flights of the omen birds along with the circumstances and social status of the listeners are considered during the omen interpretations.

The praying and propitiation to certain gods to obtain good omens which indicate God's favour and blessings are held in a series of three-tiered classes of minor ceremonies, intermediate rites ( or ), and major festivals in ascending order and complexity. Any Iban Dayak will undergo some forms of simple rituals and several elaborate festivals as necessary in their lifetime from a baby, adolescent to adulthood until death. The longhouse where the Iban Dayaks stay is constructed in a unique way to function for both living or accommodation purposes and ritual or religious practices. Nearby the longhouse, there is normally a small and simple hut called langkau ampun/sukor (forgiveness/thanksgiving hut) built to place offerings to deities. Sometimes, when potentially bad omens are encountered, a small hut is quickly built and a fire is started before saying prayers to seek good outcomes.

Common among all these propitiations is that prayers to gods and/or other spirits are made by giving offerings ("piring"), certain poetic leka main and animal sacrifices ("genselan") either chickens or pigs. The number (leka or turun) of each piring offering item is based on ascending odd numbers which have meanings and purposes as below:
 piring 1 for piring jari (feeding)
 piring 3 for piring ampun (mercy) or seluwak (wastefulness spirit)
 piring 5 for piring minta (request) or bejalai (journey)
 piring 7 for piring gawai (festival) or bujang berani (brave warrior)
 piring 9 for sangkong (including others) or turu (leftover included)
 contains an offering of various traditional foods and drinks while  is made by sacrificing chickens for bird omens or pigs for animal omens.

This category is smaller than or sometimes relegated from the full-scaled and thus costly festivals for cost savings but still maintaining the effectiveness to achieve the same purpose.

The major festivals comprise at least seventh categories which are related to major aspects of Iban's traditional way of life i.e. agriculture, headhunting, fortune, health, death, procreation, and weaving.

With paddy being the major sustenance of life among Dayaks, so the first major category comprises the agricultural-related festivals which are dedicated to paddy farming to honour Sempulang Gana who is the deity of agriculture. It is a series of festivals that include Gawai Batu (Whetstone Festival), Gawai Ngalihka Tanah (Soil Ploughing Festival), Gawai Benih (Seed Festival), Gawai Ngemali Umai (Farm Healing Festival), Gawai Matah (Harvest Initiation Festival), and Gawai Basimpan (Paddy Storing Festival). According to Derek Freeman, there are 27 steps of hill paddy farming. One common ritual activity is called "mudas" (making good) any omens found during any farming stages, especially the early bush clearing stage.

The second category includes the headhunting-related festivals to honour the most powerful deity of war, Sengalang Burong that comprises Gawai Burong (Bird Festival) and Gawai Amat/Asal (Real/Original Festival) with their successive ascending stages with the most famous one being Gawai Kenyalang (Hornbill Festival). This is perhaps the most elaborate and complex festival which can last into seven successive days of ritual incantation by lemambang bards. It is held normally after instructed by spirits in dreams. It is performed by tuai kayau (raid leader) called bujang berani (leading warriors) and war leader (tuai serang) who are known as "raja berani" (bravery king). In the past, this festival is vital to seek divine intervention to defeat enemies such as Baketan, Ukit, and Kayan during migrations into new territories.

With the suppression of headhunting, the next important and third category relates to the death-related rituals among which the biggest celebration is the Soul Festival (Gawai Antu) to honour the souls of the dead especially the famous and brave ones who are invited to visit the living for the Sebayan (Haedes) to feast and to bestow all sorts of helpful charms to the living relatives. The  (brave king) can be honoured by his descendants up to three times via Gawai Antu.

The fourth category in term of complexity and importance is the fortune-related festivals which consist of Gawai Pangkong Tiang (Post Banging Festival) after transferring to a new longhouse, Gawai Tuah (Luck Festival) with three ascending stages to seek and to welcome lucks, and Gawai Tajau (Jar Festival) to welcome newly acquired jars.

Manang is consecrated via an official ceremony called  (Manang Consecration Festival). Besides, Gawai Burung can also be used for healing certain difficult-to-cure sickness via magical power by Sengalang Burong especially nowadays after headhunting has been stopped.

The sixth category of festivals pertains to procreation. Gawai Lelabi (River Turtle Festival) is held to pray to the deity of creation called Selampadani, to announce the readiness of daughters for marriage and to solicit a suitable suitor. This is where those men with trophy head skulls become leading contenders. The wedding ceremony is called Melah Pinang (Areca nut Splitting). The god of creation Selampandai is invoked here for the fertility of the daughters to bear many children. There is a series of ritual rites from birth to adolescence of children.

The last and seventh category is Gawai Ngar (Cotton-Dyeing Festival) which is held by women who are involved in weaving  for conventional use and ritual purposes. Ritual textiles woven by Iban women are used in the Bird Festival and in the past used to receive trophy heads.

The Iban religion involves worshiping and honouring at least four categories of beings, i.e. Bunsu Petara (the supreme god), and his seven deities (the divine people of Tansang Kenyalang), the holy spirits of Orang Panggau Libau and Gelong, the ghost spirits (Bunsu Antu) and the souls of dead ancestors.

The domains of these beings are as follows:
 from the sky which refers to gods living in the sky i.e. Sengalang Burung, Ini Andan, Seragindit, Bunsu Bintang Banyak, Bunsu Bintang Tiga, Bunsu Bintang Tujuh, Bunsu Bulan and Bunsu Guntur.
 from the tree top which refers to omen birds i.e. Ketupung, Beragai, Bejampung, Pangkas, Embuas, Papau and Nendak 
from the land which refers to augury animals, snakes, reptiles and insects i.e. Simpulang Gana, Selempandai, Seragindah and People of Panggau Libau and Gelung Batu Nakung
 from the water which refers to fishes and water creatures i.e. Seragindi, Bunsu Ikan, Bunsu Tekuyung, Bunsu Lelabi, Bunsu Gerama and Bunsu Baya
 from the sea (ari tasek) such as Ribai and his group
 from the forest (ari kampong baong) notably antu grasi (huntsman demons)
 from the tree branch (ari dan pun kayu) i.e. bujang inin (leopard cat) 
 from the cave (ari lubang batu) i.e. bujang lembau (remaong tiger) 
 from the under world (sebayan) i.e. Raja Niram and his kingdom of the dead

The supreme God is called Bunsu (Kree) Petara, and is sometimes called Raja Entala or even Tuhan Allah Taala (Arabic defines the article al- "the" and ilāh "deity, god" to al-lāh meaning "the [sole] deity, God") in modern times. The Iban calls this supreme god who creates the universe by the three names of Seragindi which makes the water, Seragindah which makes the land and Seragindit which makes the sky.

There are seven deities or demi-gods or regents of the Iban who act as the messengers between human beings and God. These deities are the children of Raja Jembu and the grandchildren of Raja Durong who originated from Sumatra. Their names are as follows:
 Sengalang Burong the god of war 
 Biku Bunsu Petara (female) the high priest
 Sempulang Gana the god of agriculture along with his father-in-law Semarugah as the god of land
 Selempandai/Selempeta/Selempetoh the god of creation and procreation.
 Menjaya Manang the god of health and shamanism being the first manang bali
 Anda Mara the god of wealth and fortune.
 Ini Andan/Inee (female) the natural-born doctor and the god of justice

There are splinter groups from the People of Tansang Kenyalang, People of Panggau and Gelong and the Iban Bejie group which are the Nising group who run away to the upper sky, Ribai group to the land across the sea and the antu grasi group who roam the forest (from Telichai and Telichu) respectively.

These spirits can be helpful in achieving success in life or malevolent like causing sickness or even madness to humans. Therefore, the Iban in general needs to keep peace and harmony with nature.

The souls of dead ancestors are invoked by the Iban when seeking their blessings. They pay their respects to their souls during Gawai Antu (Festival of the Dead) and when visiting their graves.

Iban propitiation 
Masing in 1981 and Sandin clearly categorise Iban's propitiation and worshiping into three main successive stages of increasing importance, complexity and intensity, i.e.

IN the upper Rajang, the offering ceremony inside the family room can be performed by women while that at the open gallery must be carried out by men of stature.

As this category of rites involves mainly  (chant), it is also normally called  (chanting).

Gawai comprises seven main categories of large festivals which mostly involve long ritual incantation by a group of  bards that can last from several to seven successive days and nights to follow the paddy farming cycle in succession of stages.

Iban ritual festivals and rites

 Farming-related festivals to propitiate the deity of agriculture Sempulang Gana, 
 War-related festivals to honor the deity of war Sengalang Burong, 
 Fortune-related festivals dedicated to the deity of fortune Anda Mara, 
 Reproductivity-related festival (Gawai Melah Pinang) for the deity of creation Selampandai, 
 Health-related festivals for the deity of shamanism Menjaya and Ini Andan and 
 Death-related festival (Gawai Antu or Ngelumbong) to invite the dead souls for final separation ritual between the living and the dead.
 Weaving-related festival (Gawai Ngar) for patrons of weaving.

Besides these seven main categories, there are two more types of rituals i.e. dream festival and intermediate-scale chanting rites.

Farming ritual festivals

Because rice farming is the key life-sustaining activity among Dayaks, the first category of festivals is related to agriculture. Thus, there are many ritual festivals dedicated to this foremost vital activity namely:
 Gawai Batu (Whetstone Festival), 
 Gawai Benih (Seed Festival), 
 Gawai Ngalihka Tanah (or Manggol) (Soil Ploughing Festival), 
 Gawai Ngemali Umai (Farm-healing Festival), 
 Gawai Matah (Harvest-starting Festival)
 Gawai Ngambi Sempeli (Taking Secondary Paddy Festival), 
 Gawai Basimpan (Rice-Keeping) Festival and
 Gawai Tajau (Jar Welcoming Festival).

The Jar festival also invokes Raja Sempulang Gana as the god of agriculture because surplus paddy is used to buy jars and brassware in the past. There is one important rite called  for strengthening any omen encountered during farming activity.

With the coming of rubber and pepper planting, the Ibans have adapted the Gawai Ngemali Umai (Paddy Farm Healing Festival) and Gawai Batu (Whetstone Festival) to hold Gawai Getah (Rubber Festival) to sharpen the tapping knives and Gawai Lada (Pepper Festival) to avoid diseases and pests associated with pepper planting respectively.

War ritual festivals

The second most important activity among the Iban in the past is headhunting (ngayau) in enemy country. Hence, the war-related festivals is held in honour of the war god, Sengalang Burong (Hawk the Bird) which manifests as the brahminy kite. These festivals are collectively called Gawai Burong (Bird Festival) in the Saribas/Skrang region or Gawai Amat (Proper Festival) in the Mujong region or Gawai Asal (Original Festival) in the Baleh region. Each set of festivals has a number of successive stages to be initiated by a notable man of prowess from time to time and hosted by individual longhouses. It originally honors warriors, but during more peaceful times has evolved into a wellness or fortune seeking ceremony.

The rules regarding headhunting and skull-related rites are as follows:

 If a warrior got 3 human skulls, he can hold  to cleanse and strengthen his souls against bad elements. 
 If a warrior got 3 human skulls, he can hold  to parade and praise his trophy heads by the women. This ceremony declares him a bujang berani (a lieutenant).
 If he got one , he can become a raid leader (at a major) attacking one longhouse at a time.
This festival declares him a raja berani (the king of valour).
 After praising the hornbill statue, he can parade and praise it along the longhouse gallery and among the audience.
Accordingly, the rank and status of the warrior will ascend from a bujang berani (brave warrior), tau kayau (raid leader) and tau serang (war general). Alternatively, the war leaders are called raja berani (the brave and rich)

Bird Festival
Gawai Burong which is mainly celebrated in the Saribas and Skrang region comprises nine ascending stages as follows: 
 Gawai Kalingkang (munti/payan pole) –  until 
 Gawai Sandong (betung/pinang trunk)-  from  until 
 Gawai Salangking –  with a  –  until  
 Gawai Mulong Merangau (Weeping Palm) or Lemba Bumbun (durian tree trunk cleverly carved like an old sago palm tree after all of its fruits has fallen to the ground –  until 
 Gawai Gajah Meram (Brooding Elephant) with Besandau Liau (a strong tree trunk with branches decorated with skulls and isang leaves)-  until 
 Gawai Meligai (Upper Palace) (decorated strong wood pole) –  until 
 Gawai Ranyai (Tree of life) or Mudur Ruruh (the pole is made up of a bunch of warriors' spears) –  until 
 Gawai Gerasi Papa (Demon Huntman) – the house where this  is held is abandoned because the inhabitants have to transfer to a new house. 
The chiefs and elders of the longhouses will convene and decide which stage of the Bird Festival fits the life achievements of each celebrant-to-be.

After a warrior obtains his first three heads, a ritual called 'enchaboh arong' (head feast) is held to honour (naku) and clean the heads by throwing out all the skin, flesh and brain inside by the most senior war leader using a war knife and a rattan to swirl out the brain in a flowing river water. During this ritual, the chief would first take a bit of the brain using the tip of his sword and put it into a lump of glutinous rice and then eat it while reciting a prayer to declare that his spirit presides over the spirit of the head and the victim. This 'eating' symbolizes the master-slave relationship between the victim and the owner of the skull. Upon reaching the longhouse, the wives or mothers would receive the heads obtained by their husbands or sons respectively using a ceremonial plate underneath of which was placed a ritual cloth (pua kumbu) which has been woven by the respective women earlier. The common motive of the ritual cloth is called "lebur api' (the heath of fire). Therefore, the women would weave ceremonial cloths according to the progress of their men. In a way, the weaving of a certain motive would incite the men to obtain heads of their traditional enemy as necessary. A guiltless people shall not be attacked and doing so would result in adverse curse called 'busong' of the perpetrators.

Hornbill Festival
Alternatively, the Iban can choose to celebrate another type of bravery-related rite i.e. a rhinoceros hornbill festival (gawai kenyalang). This festival comprises three stages of chanting i.e. nesting (besarang), egg laying (betelu) and flying (terebai). The Iban believes this festival originated by the heroes of Panggau and Gelong i.e. Keling and Laja when they beautifully handcrafted a hornbill statue for their sweethearts (Kumang and Lulong) respectively which become alive and flew to the doors of their sweethearts' family rooms upon revelation to the audience. The beaks of the hornbill statues must be directed to the country of the enemies so that the hornbills fly there to attack and peck the eyes of the enemies in advance of the incoming attack. Hence, the hornbill festival is held to honour and propitiate the heroes of Panggau and Gelong who are believed to be able to assist in major undertakings like wars, depending on the guardian of the warrior.

Proper Festival

In the Baleh region, the Iban there celebrates a slightly different set of Gawai Amat (Proper Festival) as listed by Masing but certainly for similar purposes:
 Gawai Tresang Mansau (a red bamboo pole receptacle)
 Gawai Kalingkang (a bamboo pole receptacle with a pan made of bamboo)
 Gawai Ijok Pumpong (decapitating of gamuti palm ritual)
 Gawai Tangga Raja (notched-ladder of wealth)
 Gawai Kayu Raya (tree of wealth ritual)
 Gawai Kenyalang (hornbill ritual)
 Gawai Nangga Langit (notched-ladder to the sky)
 Gawai Tangga Ari (notched-ladder of day) – this festival is a reconstruction of the Iban famous ancestor, Bejie's undertaking of building a notched ladder to the sky to meet God.

The chiefs and elders of the longhouses will convene and decide which degree of the original festival that fits the achievement of each celebrant to be.

There are nine levels of the timang inchantation length with their respective end timing as follows:
 Ngerara rumah (start of timang to discovery of Lang's absence)
 Ngua (nursing the trophy head) – Afternoon second day
 Nyingka (end of forging) – Later afternoon third day
 Bedua antara (dividing the land) – Afternoon fourth day
 Nyulap (first rite of planting) – Morning fifth day
 Ninjau balayan (surveying the padi) – Morning fifth day
 Nekok (first rite of harvesting) – Afternoon fifth day
 Nyimpan padi (storing the padi) – Afternoon fifth day
 Nempalai kasai (planting of cotton) – Morning seventh day

Original Festival

 Gawai Tresang Mansau (a bamboo receptacle erected under the roof atap downend) 
 Gawai Kalingkang (a woven huge bamboo receptacle erected in the middle of the tanju)
 Gawai Ijok Pumpong (a woven huge bamboo basket or mat hung using a rattan which will be slashed by a sword)
 Gawai Sempuyung Mata Ari (a split bamboo cone to receive fresh head skull) 
 Gawai Lemba Bumbun (Lemba split leaves which represent taken enemy's hairs)
 Gawai Kenyalang (erection of hornbill statues to attack enemies before headhunting raids)
 Gawai Sandung Liau (a wooden pole with a boat head statue (udu prau)
 Gawai Mapal Tunggul (Decapitating tree stump with erected three poles in series in the tanju)

For all three groups of war-related festival above, as the stage of the celebration ascends the list, the level of the timang incantation also increases, following the paddy farming stages with the first stage normally ends up to ngua (nursing) level after which gods will presents gifts in the forms of charms or medicines which help or eases the life building activities of the festival host and fellow celebrants.

Fortune ritual festivals

Seeking health, wealth, fame and prosperity is another important activity of the Iban. Therefore, the third category of festivals is fortune-related festivals which include Gawai Pangkong Tiang (House Main Post Striking Festival) or Gawai Tuah with three successive stages (Luck Seeking, Luck Welcoming and Luck Growing). Some Iban people call Gawai Pangkong Tiang as Gawai Niat (Intention Festival) or Gawai Diri (Rising up Festival).

Reproductivity ritual festivals

Furthermore, the Iban love to bear and raise many children to continue their descendancy, as a means to acquire more land and wealth and perhaps to multiply in numbers as a natural defence against enemy tribes. So comes the fourth category of festival which is reproductivity-related i.e. Gawai Lelabi (River Turtle Festival) that is held for announcing readiness of daughters for marriage and to call for suitable suitors. The wedding ceremony is itself called Melah Pinang (Areca beetle nut splitting) which is celebrated with much fanfare and ritual. Here the God invoked is Selampandai for fertility and reproductive purposes to bear many children. In addition, if an Iban married couple could not bear any child after some years of marriage, they can decide to adopt via a Gawai Bairu-Iru (Adoption Festival) to declare that they have adopted someone which shall have the same rights as their own born child. Furthermore, Gawai Batimbang (Manutrition Festival) can be held to free  slaves (war captives) or serfs (debtors) and/or to adopt them as children or siblings or relatives of their masters.

Health ritual festivals

The Iban pay great attention to their health and well-being to have a long life. So the fifth category of festivals is health-related festivals which are Gawai Sakit (Sickness Festival), Gawai Betawai (Name Changing Festival), Besugi Sakit (Healing by Keling) and Barenong Sakit (Healing by Menjaya).

Death ritual festivals

The sixth category of festivals by the Iban is related to death which is called the Spirit festival for the dead (Gawai Antu) or Gawai Rugan (Dead Soul Altar Festival) or Gawai Sungkop (Tomb Festival) in the Saribas/Skrang region or Gawai Ngelumbong (Entombment Festival) in the Baleh region. This festival is used to be held once every 10 to 30 years per longhouse. During this festival, the dead souls or spirits are invited to attend.

The chanting is to narrate the invitation and coming of souls from the land of the dead led by their king by the name of Raja Niram. Among the entourage are the Iban famous warriors in the region who have died. So, the  drinking ceremony is performed in memory of the famous warriors. Before drinking the two sacred wines, the chanting bard will ask the warriors of their praisenames which they declare to the audience, which indicate the achievements of the warriors and are often followed by war cries and standing ovations. Only warriors who ever obtain enemy heads are permitted to drink both sacred wines. A sacred hut is made for each dead and erected over their grave on the following day.

Weaving ritual festivals

While the Iban man strives to be a successful in headhunting and wealth acquisition, the Iban women aims to be skillful in weaving which is considered women's own warpath because weaving needs guiding spirits (albeit female) like those for headhunting. For women involved in weaving, their ritual festival is called Gawai Ngar (Cotton-Dyeing Festival). This can perhaps be considered the seventh category of festivals among the Iban. Pua Kumbu, the Iban traditional hand-woven cloth and custom, is used for both conventional and ceremonial uses in many occasions. A motive called "Lebor Api" (Melting Fire) is used to ceremously receive freshly-taken heads.

Dream Festival

There is an emerging category of life-building gawai called dream festivals such as Gawai Lesong (Rice Mortar Festival) and Gawai Tangga (Notched Ladder Festival) and some newly innovated variants of the gawai proper as a result of dream by a person or several individuals. These are popular among the Iban in the upper Rajang region.

The original festival consists of the nine successive and ascending stages of major celebrations as listed by Dr. Robert Menua of Tun Jugah Foundation during an individual Iban man life as if he ascends the longhouse notched ladder rungs. This category of original festival can be celebrated by any Iban if it is deemed fit to do so as he ages during his lifetime, even without any dream.

The Iban will hold a dream festival when told to do so in a dream which will instruct the type and sometimes even the procedure of the festival to be held and thus it is fittingly coined as dream festival. However, these are called  (proper/real festival) as the full, elaborate and complex procedure of an Iban festival is strictly followed and implemented during its celebration. A good example to accompany this explanation is the hornbill festival which was held not only as an original festival but also as a dream festival with variations in its procedure of celebration.

Intermediate ritual rites

For simplicity and cost savings, some of the  have been relegated into the medium category of propitiation called  such as Gawai Tuah into Nimang Tuah, Gawai Benih into Nimang Benih and Gawa Beintu-intu into their respective nimang category wherein the key activity is the timang inchantation by the bards. Gawai Matah can be relegated into a minor rite simply called matah. The paddy's net is erected by splitting a bamboo trunk into four pieces along its length with their tips inserted into the ground soil. Underneath the paddy's net, all the paddy seeds in baskets or gunny sacks are kept before being distributed by a line of ladies into dibbled holes by a line men in front.

It is common that all those festivals are to be celebrated after the rice harvesting completion which is normally by the end of May during which rice is plenty for holding feasts along with poultry like pigs, chickens, fish from rivers and jungle meats like deer etc. Therefore, it is fitting to call this festive season among Dayak collectively as the Gawai Dayak festival which is celebrated every year on 1 June, at the end of the harvest season, to worship the Lord Sempulang Gana and other gods. On this day, the Iban get together to celebrate, often visiting each other.

Iban piring or ritual offerings
The Iban  which is the number of each offering item is basically according to the single odd numbers which are  1, 3, 5, 7 and 9.  (the number of each offering item) depends on how many deities are to be invited and presented with offerings which number should normally be an odd figure.

The list of deities to be prayed to and offered with foods and drinks are as follows: 
 Sengalang Burong – when preparing for war or major event like participating in election. Gawai Burong is usually held to honor him and to seek his blessing.
 Raja Simpulang Gana – when dealing with farming related activities, during Gawai Umai and related festivals.
 Raja Menjaya & Ini Inda – when asking for better health during Gawai Sakit and related activities such as belian.
 Anda Mara – when seeking good fortune and material wealth, during Gawai Pangkong Tiang.
 Selampandai – when seeking blessings in marriage, growth of children, or fertility, during Gawai Melah Pinang.
 Raja Semarugah – when seeking permission to use land for construction and other activities like agricultural activities (when erecting the first pole).
 Keling and orang Panggau and Gelong – when seeking their help to go to war, election, defence from enemies, or when seeking their help to invite gods to festivals.
 Souls of dead ancestors – when seeking their blessing and showing respect for their soul. Usually during Gawai Antu and when visiting their graves.
 Bunsu Antu – as and when instructed in dreams.

The set of offerings is dedicated to each part of the long house room such as  four corners,  (verandah),  (gallery),  (kitchen),  (rice jar),  (verandah behind the kitchen), farm, garden of rubber or black pepper, other possessions like long boat with its engine,  (jar), cannon and modern items like, car, motorcycle, etc. as deemed fit and necessary.

The rule on how to choose the  according to its purpose is as follows:
  (personal offering inside a pair of hands made into a bowl-like to be eaten by the owner of the hands)
  (for apologies or economy)
  (for requests or journey)
  (for festivals or brave men)
  (for including others)
  (for including others and any leftover offering items are placed together)
  9 (11, 13, 15, 18 up to 30) –  (leftover offering items must be all offered and cannot be eaten).

The number of each item of offerings can be varied according to the importance of the god or item. The number of each item of offerings can be multiplied to correspond with the locations for placing the offerings. A plate, wide leave or a woven bamboo basket will be used for serving the offerings. Most of the times, the offerings are hung onto a part of the building or tree branch or trunk, placed over a jar or simple platform or a bamboo stick with a receptacle at its top.

Whenever a simple set of offerings need to be prepared, simple ilum pinang (clumps of Ereca nuts with sireh leave with a splash of white kapu carbonate) will be offered. This is especially so during travelling i.e. when encountering undeliberate omens.

The basic items for common piring offerings include at least the following items in a sequential order: 
 betel nuts, sirih leaves, sedi leaves and  chalk 
 cigar leaves and tobacco
 a lump of normal cooked rice
 a pinch of salt 
 ' (sacheted glutinous rice) corresponding with the number of offerings
  (wrapped glutinous rice)
  (glutinous rice cooked in bamboo container)
  (flattened glutinous rice flour cake)
  (semi-fermented glutinous rice)
  (disc-shaped cake made from glutinous rice flour which is deep-fried in cooking oil)
  (flowery-shaped molded biscuit made from glutinous rice flour) 
  (ant nest biscuit made of glutinous rice)
  (alcoholic drink fermented from glutinous rice with yeast)
 hard-boiled chicken eggs and uncooked chicken eggs
 A live chicken or a pig is caught and kept ready within a short distance

Special offerings to Lang (god of war) or Keling (cultural hero) has several unique offering items.

So it can be seen from the list of items above that it is customary to offer guests or gods cigarettes, sireh leaves and betel nuts as courtesy dictates. These first items are placed into a brass container which is always ready by each Iban family in the longhouse in anticipation of guests. Secondly it is necessary to offer food and drinks as essential items. It is customary to ask whether guests have already eaten or to invite them straight away to eat once food and dishes are ready, especially during meal times.

In addition, biscuits and deserts are offered after meals as a sign of hospitality in Iban custom. All these ingredients are put onto plates or woven baskets made of bamboo or rattan which are then arranged in several rows on a ritual  (ceremonial blanket).

In urgent or emergency cases,  (an odd number of lumps of sireh, betel nuts and cigarettes are offered because many Iban would always carry these items anywhere they go or during their travels to negate any bad omens or to show thanks for a good augury. A small offering platform may be built to place this simple offering and a short  prayer is recited. At least a fire is lit in recognition of the omen and to warm up those present which necessitates a pause from the current activities at hands.

A number of worthy men are chosen or nominated to divide and serve the offerings onto old clay plates (plastic plates are to be avoided because they are recent invention and indicative of cheapness or lower status unless clay plates are not available or cannot be borrowed from neighbors; at a minimum, the main offering plate must be on a clay plate). Women can be selected especially if the offering is done within the  room.

Some offerings are placed on a long bamboo pole with a conical receptacle at its top.

The  items are taken by those chosen one by one in the order listed above or some people take the oily penganan (sweet disc shaped pancake) as the first favorite delicacy and placed it in the middle of the place or container to prevent stickiness of the fingers and followed by other items. The aim is to serve and present the offerings beautifully and as attractive as possible to arouse the appetite of the guests or gods.

As the propitiation increases in importance and size from normal and brief  offerings, to medium-sized  ceremonies to huge and lengthy  festivals, the number and set of offerings also increases accordingly. All major and minor gods are offered  offerings to ensure prosperity and peace during the occasions and in life.

The  (animal offering) is normally made in the form of a chicken or a pig, depending on the scale of the ceremony. For small ceremonies, e.g. bird omens, chickens will be used, while on larger occasions such as animal omens, pigs will be sacrificed.

The chicken feathers are pulled and smeared into the blood of the chicken whose throat has been slit and the chicken head may be put onto the main offering plate. For festivals, one or several pigs and tens of chickens may be sacrificed to appease the deities invoked and to serve human guests invited to the festivals within the territorial domain of the feast chief.

The pig head may be offered with the offerings or buried into ground. The body of the chicken or pig and leftover  materials can be eaten by guests, provided the chicken or pig is not killed or sacrificed to cleanse sin or bad luck like in incest cases which can cause havoc in the Iban faith. If not eaten, the body may be buried as sacrifice.

Adat Iban or customary law

The Iban use a customary law called adat which are used as social control measures to maintain law and order, keep security and peace, and ensure shared prosperity among them. Among the main sections of customary adat of the Iban Dayaks according to Benedict Sandin are as follows:
 Adat berumah (House building rule)
 Adat melah pinang, butang ngau sarak (Marriage, adultery and divorce rule)
 Adat beranak (Child bearing and raising rule)
 Adat bumai and beguna tanah (Agricultural and land use rule)
 Adat ngayau (Headhunting rule)
 Adat ngasu, berikan, ngembuah and napang manyi (Hunting, fishing, fruit and honey collection rule)
 Adat tebalu, ngetas ulit ngau beserarak bungai(Widow/widower, mourning and soul separation rule)
 Adat begawai (festival rule)
 Adat idup di rumah panjai (Order of life in the longhouse rule)
 Adat betenun, main lama, kajat ngau taboh (Weaving, past times, dance and music rule)
 Adat beburong, bemimpi ngau becenaga ati babi (Bird and animal omen, dream and pig liver rule)
 Adat belelang tauka bejalai (Journey or Sojourn rule)

The Iban social structure is egalitarian. Upon the death of an Iban, there will be a session called ngambi tebalu (taking a fee of appreciation) from the living spouse or the family of the last surviving spouse). After this ceremony is over, the surviving spouse can remarry if he or she wished to do so. The amount of the fee depends on the accomplishment of the deceased during his or her lifetime. The common careers of Iban men are being a warrior, chief, bard, shaman, farmer, trader, etc. while those of Iban women centre on bearing and raising children, farming, weaving, etc.

Cuisine

The Iban's traditional cuisines include lulun or pansoh (foods cooked in bamaboo containers), kasam (meat, fish or vegetables salted and preserved in jars or tin), tuak (glutinous rice wine) and Langkau (vodka from distilled from boiled rice wine).

The Iban's staple food is rice from paddy planted on hill or swamp with hill rice having better taste and more valuable. A second staple food used to be "mulong" (sago powder) and the third one is tapioca.

The Iban's famous cuisine is called "lulun" or "pansoh" which is wild meat, fish or vegetable cooked in wild bamboo containers over fire. Another dish is called "kasam" which is preserved wild meat, fish or vegetable in salt and placed in a ceramic jar. Natural nuts and leaves (called buah and duan kepayang) are often added into the salt-preserved foods.

Glutinuous rice (asi pulut pansoh) cooked in bamboo containers is a delicacy among the Iban. Powder of glutinous rice is used to make penganan pancake, kui sepit (crab crawls) and sarang semut ant nest biscuit. The source of sugar is honey and sugar cane. The Iban likes to cook their meat or fish as lulun or pansuh to which salt, ginger and vegetable leaves (such as bungkang, riang, tapioca) are added. Soup (sabau) is made of meat and vegetables such as shoots is cooked in an earthenware (periuk tempa) and later in a copper pot (temaga) and steel pot.

Tuak is originally made of cooked glutinous rice (Asi Pulut) mixed with home-made yeast (Chiping/Ragi) for fermentation. It is a rice wine drunk after dinner and served to guests, especially as a welcoming drink when entering a longhouse. Nowadays, there are various kinds of tuak, made with rice alternatives such as sugar cane, ginger and corn. However, these raw materials are rarely used unless available in large quantities.

Tuak and other types of drinks (both alcohol and non-alcoholic) can be served on several rounds in a ceremony called nyibur temuai (serving drinks to guests) as ai aus (thirst quenching drink), ai basu kaki (feet washing drink), ai basa (respect drink) and ai untong (profit drink). The drink server will give the toast speech before each round of the drink.

Another type of a stronger alcoholic drink is called langkau or "arak panduk", which contains a higher alcohol content. It is made from tuak which has been distilled over fire to boil off the alcohol into vapour, which is then cooled and collected into a container. Ijok (gamulti palm) drink is another type of alcoholic drink among the Iban.

Other traditional cakes are called sarang semut (ants' nest, penganan or penyaram (discus-shaped cake) and kui sepit (twisted cake) which can last longer due to deep frying in cooking oil. Other delicacies include emping padi (rice oat), rendai (popped rice), tumpi (disc-shaped cake), asi pulut (cooked in bamaboo container or daun long leaves), senupat (cooked in woven containers or pokyuk).

Besides rice, the Iban eat linut mulong (sago flour) and tapioca. Lingkau or nyeli and millet are also planted among the hill paddy. The Iban's signature vegetable is called the "terung asam" which is in a globe shape and sour in taste. Ensabi iban is a type of spinach planted after burning of hill paddy farm.

Iban omens and augury 

The augury system for the Iban Dayaks depends on several ways to obtain indicative omens for decision making and action taking, either  deliberately sought or accidentally encountered:
 dream to present charm gifts or sumpah (curse) by spirits which normally has a long or life-time effect.
 omen animals (burong laba) such as deer barkings which also has life-time effects.
 omen birds (burong Mali) which give temporary effects limited to certain activities at hands e.g. that year of farming.
 pig liver divination (Betenong ati babi) at the end of certain festival to read the future luck.
 areca nut blossom flower (betenong ngena bungai pinang) after pelian healing ceremony. 
 nampok (seclusion) or betapa (isolation)
The omens can be either deliberately sought via dream during sleep, langkau burong (bird hut), pig liver divination and seclusion/isolation or unexpectedly encountered y chance especially the animal and bird omens e.g. while working at farms or walking to enemy country.

For agricultural augury, there are eleven augury animals which are under Sempulang Gana and empowered by the deities to send a stroke of luck (nganjong laba) to human farmers in the world of men: 
 Tuchok or Belangkiang (lizard with a white stripe along its mouth), 
 Ulat Bulu (Hairy caterpillar), 
 Ingkat (Tarsier), 
 Bengkang (Slow Loris), 
 Menarat (Monitor Lizard), 
 Pelandok (Mousedeer), 
 Landak (Porcupine), 
 Kijang (Barking deer), 
 Rusa (Sambar deer), 
 Beruang (Bear) and 
 Jani Babas (Wild boar).
Logically, the presence of these animals indicate that the land is fertile for agriculture as the animals find foods and drinks, and may live in this area where the natural growth of the forest or jungle has reached a mature stage with plenty of dead things which act as natural fertilizer when burnt in addition to ash of cut and burnt trees and bushes. The Iban would observe the size of trees to be about a hug around the perimeter of the tree trunk to roughly indicate the fertility and suitability of the land for farming.

The augury snakes that represent the earthly forms of People of Panggau and Gelong include kendawang coral snakes (Maticora spp.), cobra (tedong), hamadryad (belalang) and python (sawa). The presence of these poisonous snakes indicate danger to humans so it is advisable to return home and take the day off for safety purposes to avoid untoward harms.

The omen birds that sends guidance and warnings from Sengalang Burong are seven in total namely:
 ketupong also known as jaloh or kikeh or entis (rufous piculet), 
 beragai (scarlet-rumped trogon), 
 pangkas (maroon woodpecker) on the right hand of the Sengalang Burong's longhouse bilek and 
 Bejampong (crested jayshrike), 
 embuas (banded kingfisher), 
 kelabu papau (Senabong) (Diard's trogon) and 
 nendak (white-rumped shama). 
Their types of calls, flights, places of hearing and circumstances of the listeners are factors to be considered during the interpretation of the bird omens. The bird omens can be sought deliberately before starting major activities or encountered accidentally while working or travelling.

The type of sacrifice (genselan) used is determined by the type of omen i.e. a chicken is used for bird omens while a pig is used for animal omens. In the absence of a pig, two chickens can be used instead.

The Iban Dayaks used to believe in having charms namely ubat (medicine), pengaroh (amulet), empelias (anti-line of fire) and engkerabun (blurredness) given by gods and spirits to help them to accomplish successes in life such as getting bountiful harvest, game or jars, to make them kebal (weapon-proof), unseen to human eyes or to make them extraordinarily stronger (kering) than other men. These attributes are wanted for rice farming, headhunting and other activities. For ladies, the charms will help them to be fertile in bearing children and skillful in weaving.

Headhunting
Among the Iban Dayaks, the origin of headhunting was believed to be meeting one of the mourning rules given by a spirit which is as follows:
 The sacred jar is not to be opened except by a warrior who has managed to obtain a head, or by a man who can present a human head, which he obtained in a fight; or by a man who has returned from a sojourn in enemy country.

There were various reasons for headhunting as listed below:
 For soil fertility, Dayaks hunted fresh heads before the paddy harvesting seasons after which a head festival would be held in honour of the new heads.
 To add supernatural strength which Dayaks believed to be centred in the soul and head of humans. Fresh heads can give magical powers for communal protection, bountiful paddy harvesting, and disease curing.
 To exact revenge for murders based on the "blood credit" principle unless "adat pati nyawa" (customary compensation token) is paid.
 To pay the dowry for marriages e.g. "derian palit mata" (eye blocking dowry) for Ibans once blood has been splashed prior to agreeing to marriage and, of course, new fresh heads show prowess, bravery, ability and capability to protect his family, community and land
 For the foundation of new buildings to be stronger and meaningful than the normal practice of not putting in human heads.
 For protection against enemy attacks according to the principle of "attack first before being attacked".
 As a symbol of power and social status ranking where the more heads someone has, the more respect and glory due to him. The warleader is called tuai serang (warleader) or raja berani (king of the brave) while kayau anak (small raid) leader is only called tuai kayau (raid leader) whereby adat tebalu (widower rule) after their death would be paid according to their ranking status in the community.
 For territorial expansion where some brave Dayaks intentionally migrated into new areas such as Mujah "Buah Raya" or migrated from Skrang to Paku to Kanowit while infighting among Ibans themselves in Batang Ai caused the Ulu Ai Ibans to migrate to Batang Kanyau River in Kapuas, Kalimantan and then proceed to Katibas and later on Ulu Rajang in Sarawak. The earlier migrations from Kapuas to Batang Ai, Batang Lupar, Batang Saribas, and Batang Krian rivers were also made possible by fighting the local tribes like Bukitan.

Often, a war leader had at least three lieutenants (called manuk sabong) who in turn had some followers. The war (ngayau) rules among the Iban Dayaks are listed below:
 If a warleader leads a party on an expedition, he must not allow his warriors to fight a guiltless tribe that has no quarrel with them.
 If the enemy surrenders, he may not take their lives, lest his army is unsuccessful in future warfare and risk fighting empty-handed war raids (balang kayau).
 The first time that a warrior takes a head or captures a prisoner, he must present the head or captive to the warleader in acknowledgement of the latter's leadership.
 If a warrior takes two heads or captives, or more, one of each must be given to the warleader; the remainder belongs to the killer or captor.
 The warleader must be honest with his followers in order that in future wars he may not be defeated (alah bunoh).

When considering a headhunting (ngayau) expedition, only an enemy shall be attacked. A guiltless tribe shall not be attacked and doing so shall result in an adverse curse called 'busong. Besides, the longhouse elders do not sanction any unwarranted provocation. The expedition must be conducted for good and the benefit of all inhabitants of the longhouse and the region. For example, a hostile enemy who attacks during farming or other routine activities can be eliminated for security and peace purposes after conflict resolution has failed. A surrendering enemy shall be not killed but taken as a slave who would be given chance to redeem themselves over time. Often, a male slave is commissioned to attack the enemy in return for his freedom and perhaps marrying a daughter of a chief who instructed him in the first place. Otherwise, the slave can plant a lot of paddy for his master in return for his freedom. A female slave can take care of the master's family especially his secludedly-raised daughter in a raised palace (meligai).

Among others, the Iban instituted a compensation custom called "adat pati nyawa' to pay the killed victim's relative, swapping of a slave or valuable jar to establish brotherhood agreement (bamboo madi) or a marriage to achieve settlement among the parties in dispute and peace in general. Hence, a headhunting is indeed a last resort. In fact, territorial disputes were the bulk of the causes of headtaking e.g. during a chance encounter between the wandering tribe and the local inhabitants which resulted in conflicts regarding ownership and conservation of forest resources. In other occasions, headhunting is usually performed on a traditional enemy who reciprocated the act from time to time. So, it is engaged in as a necessity for survival.

There is a set of rules used in engaging in headhunting between the leader and his followers. A usual procedure of headhunting starts when a group of warriors agree to go on a sojourn to an enemy country during the month of adventure (belelang) which is the period waiting for the paddy to grow and bear rice seeds before the harvesting season comes. Often, a junior warrior may go alone or in small group to attack an enemy by an element of surprise. Only a proven leader having seven heads to his credit can mobilize and lead a larger troop to raid a longhouse. A well-established leader with more than twenty one heads (three rings of skulls) can lead and wage a war against a region.

After defeating and severing a head, the winning warrior will shower himself in the fresh blood dripping from the enemy's severed head (mandi darah) while shouting triumphs of victory (panjung). He also puts the severed head on his shoulders. The taken heads shall then be presented to the leader who then decides whether the warrior can own the head or not. Usually, the first head taken by a warrior will be owned by the leader while the rest owns by the warrior. The same rules applies to live catch of enemy (tangkap) or taken goods. Severed heads will be smoked by the second in command.  Upon reaching the longhouse, the warrior will shout in triumph to announce victory.

After obtaining the first three heads, a warrior and his longhouse can hold a ritual ceremony called 'enchaboh arong' to celebrate, honour and clean the taken head. The headtaking (ngayau) chief shall clean the smoked head in three steps: cutting off the hair for safekeeping and decorating the end of a sword handle, taking a small lump of the brain using the tip of his sword and puffing it into a lump of glutinous rice before eating it in one go, skinning off the skin and flesh using his sword, churning out the brain inside using a rattan to swirl out and stir the brain out of the skull in a flowing river water, making a rattan basket to keep the cleaned skull, drying the cleaned skull in sunlight for several days and smoking it during the night over a fire heath (bedilang) at the gallery (ruai). Once a warrior has obtained seven skulls, he can formally make a ring (bengkong) to hand his head trophies at the gallery for safekeeping and showcasing them. The skulls need to be ritually well-cared for and fed regularly as valuable possessions which were considered worth more than gold.

To be an effective warrior, the Iban invoke divine assistance by performing various ritual festivals in ascending order according to the warrior's accomplishment. The Iban likens their warrior's career path to the rung of the longhouse ladder until he reaches the pinnacle. Meanwhile, the women will indulge in their own war path in weaving a string of ritual cloths called 'pua kumbu' whose design motive is ideally one step ahead of the current achievement of his husband or son to inspire and motivate their men for more skulls.

Piracy 

The Sea Dayaks, as their name implies, are a maritime set of tribes, and fight chiefly in canoes and boats. One of their favorite tactics is to conceal some of their larger boats, and then to send some small and badly manned canoes forward to attack the enemy to lure them. The canoes then retreat, followed by the enemy, and as soon as they passes the spot where the larger boats are hidden, they are attacked by them in the rear, while the smaller canoes, which have acted as decoys, turn and join in the fight. The rivers arc are chosen for this kind of attack, the overhanging branches of trees and the dense foliage of the bank affording excellent hiding places for the boats.

Many of the Sea Dayaks were also pirates led by Brunei chiefs. In the 19th century there was a great deal of piracy, and it was secretly encouraged by the Brunei rulers, who obtained a share of the spoil, and also by the Malays who knew well how to handle a boat. The coastal fleet consisted of a large number of long war boats or prahu, each about 90 feet (27 m) long or more, and carrying a brass gun in the bow, the pirates being armed with swords, spears and muskets. Each boat was paddled by from 60 to 80 men. These boats skulked about in the sheltered coves waiting for their prey, and attacked merchant vessels making the passage between China and Singapore. The Malay pirates and their Dayak allies would wreck and destroy every trading vessel they came across, murder most of the crew who offered any resistance, and the rest were made as slaves. The Dayak would cut off the heads of those who were slain, smoke them over the fire to dry them, and then take them home to treasure as valued possessions.

Iban traditional musics

Drum music
There are three categories of long cylindrical drum music according to their purpose of play i.e. ritual, entertainment and shamanic.

One important and frequently played long cylindrical drum music performed by the Ibans is called . It is played only for religious festivals with the following instruments:
 The music from a first  gong is called 
 The music from a second  gong is called 
 The music from a third  gong is called 
 As the three  gongs sound together, then a first  gong is beaten and is added to by the beating of another  gong to make the music.

The music is played using the  drums by one or up to eleven drummers performing at the same time. The major types of drum music are known as follows:
 Gendang Bebandong
 Gendang Lanjan
 Gendang Enjun Batang
 Gendang Tama Pechal
 Gendang Pampat
 Gendang Tama Lubang
 Gendang Tinggang Batang
 Singkam Nggam

All these types are played by drummers on the open air verandas during the celebration of the Gawai Burong festival. The Singkam Nggam music is accompanied by the quick beating of a beliong adze. After each of these types has been played, the drummers beat another music called , which is followed by still another called .

The ordinary types of music beaten by drummers for pleasure are as follows:
 Gendang Dumbang
 Gendang Ngang
 Gendang Ringka
 Gendang Enjun Batang
 Kechendai Inggap Diatap
 Gendang Kanto

 Gendang Dudok
 Gendang Rueh
 Gendang Kelakendai
 Gendang Tari
 Gendang Naik
 Gendang Po Umboi
 Gendang Sembayan
 Gendang Layar
 Gendang Bebandong
 Gendang Nyereman

Gendang Bebandong also must be beaten when a  dies and is beaten again when his coffin is lowered from the open air verandah to the ground below on its way to the cemetery for burial.

Taboh music
One Iban writer briefly describes the rhythms of taboh music played the Iban's brass band orchestra which translates as "The number of musicians to play taboh music is four ie one playing the bebendai (small gong) which is beaten first of all to determine the rhythm of the taboh, responded to by the gendang or dedumbak drum, followed by the tawak (big gong) and finalized by the engkerumong set."

To the laymen's ears, the rhythms of  music for ngajat dance is only two i.e. fast or slow but actually it has four types namely Ayun Lundai (slow swing), Ai Anyut (flowing water), Sinu Ngenang (sad remembrance) and Tanjak Ai (against the water flow).

Ngajat dance
There are about four categories of Iban traditional  dance according to their respective functional purpose i.e. showmanship, ritual, comedial and self-defence. These are described below:

Showmanship dance
  (welcoming dance) by a group of females
  (female dance)
  (a female dance with a woven blanket which is most likely woven by herself)
  (male dance)
  (rice mortar dance)
  (dance with one rice ceramic plate held on each palm while tapping the plates with an empty bullet shell inserted into the middle fingers of both hands)
  (warrior dance with full costume, a shield and sword)
  (hand combat dance normally between two male dancers)
  (fort defence dance)
  (dance by a group of men and ladies)
  (dance by a group of men and ladies on a raised up wooden plank)
  (dance on top of gongs by ladies with gentlemen in the background)
  (dance by a man with several ladies behind who lead the procession of guests during festivals)

Ritual dance
  as a group of men with a sword and  leaves.
  (pathway-clearing),  (pathway fencing)
  (longhouse contribution collection)
  (dancing around the festival ritual pole)
  (welcoming human heads)
  (welcoming hornbill statue)

Comedial dance
  (monkey dance)
 (stinging Ants' nest collection)
  (rattan pulling dance)
  (blowpiping dance)
  (paddling dance)
  (drunk dance)
  (running scared dance e.g. scared of animals while hunting)
  (lazy woman dance)
  (frog dance)
  (upside down huntsman dance)
  (coconut shell dance)
  (squirrel going down dance)
  (other animal mimicking dance)

Self-defence dance
  (self-defence dance)
  (martial art dance)
 
 

According to one Iban writer, when a warrior performs the  dance with the music of a  orchestra, he does it as if he is fighting against an enemy. With occasional shouts he raises his shield with one arm and swings his ilang knife with his other arm as he moves towards the enemy. While he moves forward he is careful with the steps of his feet to guard them from being cut by his foe. The tempo of his action is very fast with his knife and shield gleaming up and down as he dances.

The enemy head may be symbolised by a coconut which is hung beforehand on the tree of life and the ending move is apologising to the guests again.

The dancer softens his body, arms and hands as he swings forward and backward. When he bends his body the swinging of his hands is very soft. The performance of the  dance is more or less like the  dance. Only when the dancer bites and raises the heavy wooden mortar with his teeth and place it again carefully on the floor, does he use extraordinary skill.

When the dancers take the floor to dance, the musicians beat two  drums, a  gong, a set of seven small gongs and a large  gong.

Poetry

The recitation of pantun and various kinds of leka main (traditional poetry) is a particularly important aspect of festivals. Any ordinary person can recite poetry for entertainment and customary purposes but sacred inchantations to invoke deities are only recited by specialists which are either a manang (shaman) or lemambang (bard) or tukang sabak.

According one Iban scholar, the leka main (poems, proses and folklores) for Iban Dayaks can be categorised into three major groups i.e. leka main pemerindang (for entertaining purposes), leka main adat basa (for customary purposes) and leka main invokasyen (for invocation purposes).

Entertainment
The entertaining leka main includes:
pantun
jawang
sanggai
ramban
entelah (riddle)
ensera (plain story)
kana (sung story)
pelandai ara
pelandai karong
wak anat mit (lullaby).

Customary
The customary leka main comprises:
jaku ansah (instroductory/invitational speech)
jaku geliga (rule and fine speech)
tanya indu (asking the lady for marriage)
muka kuta  (ceremonial stockade opening)
muka kujuk (food coverage opening) 
jaku karong (speech with hidden meanings) 
jaku dalam (deep speech)
jaku sempama (exemplary speech) 
jaku silup (speech with inter-twined meanings)
sugi semain
renong semain 
renong ngayap (courting) etc.

Invocation
The invocation leka main consists of:
sampi (prayer)
biau (cleansing)
denjang (blessing)
renong sabong
renong kayau
timang (chanting by a group of lemambang bards)
pengap (chanting by a group of lemambang bards) 
pelian 
sugi sakit
renong sakit
sabak bebuah or sungkop or rugan (dirge) 

These invocatory inchantations must be accompanied with piring (ritual offerings) to appease the gods invoked during the festival. The inchantation can last the whole night of the festival and the next morning a pig is sacrificed for divination of its liver which is interpreted to forecast the luck, fortune, health and success of the feast host and his family in the future.

Traditional possessions

Head Skull
The Ibans used to regard human skulls (called ) obtained during headhunting raids (ngayau) as their most prized trophy and possession.

Jar

Brassware

Paddy
Getting a lot of paddy used to be highly regarded and perhaps an indication of wealth.

Shaman and bard
Having a  shaman and  bards is also regarded necessary possession with the Iban riverine community. This practice used to be to have one set per river tributary, if not per a longhouse. Nowadays, obtaining educational degrees is foremost in the Iban minds e.g. the target is to have a degree graduate per family  within a longhouse.

Land
The Iban aims to own land as much as possible via  (jungle clearing) before when fresh jungles were still available in abundance. Therefore, the Ibans were willing to migrate to new areas. Before the arrival of James Brooke, the Iban had migrated from Kapuas to Saribas and Skrang, Batang Ai, Sadong, Samarahan, Katibas, Kapit and Baleh in order to own fress tracks of jungles among the reasons. Some Ibans participated in Brooke-led punitive expeditions against their own countrymen in exchange for areas to migrate to.

Longhouse
Many Iban still believes in the necessity and importance of living in longhouses rather single-houses within a  village e.g. during gatherings, meetings, farming and festivals.

Defence weaponry
In addition, the Iban will look for charms called  etc.

Longboat
Each Iban family will own at least one long boat for transportation along rivers.

Modernized culture

Head taking has been prohibited a long time ago while the traditional belief system of the Iban has been replaced by new religions. In view of this, the Iban institutes a modernized version of their culture. For example, the main activity nowadays is obtaining education instead of farming and head taking. The progress in obtaining the ascending levels of education has been likened to the ascension in the career path of traditional farming and head taking. For example, obtaining a bachelor's degree or holding executive positions is regarded as equivalent to obtaining several heads which qualifies the bachelor holders to be called 'bujang or dara berani' (brave bachelor or bachelorette). A master's degree holder is ranked to be qualified as a raid leader (tau kayau) or holding middle management posts. The PhD degree holder is qualified to be a war leader (tau serang) or top management heads.

Likewise, all traditional Iban rituals can be replaced by equivalent Christian prayer sessions. It is not necessary to replace the Iban cultural system with that of the Western as performed by Jesus Christ in the Bible. The Iban cultural, language, literature, adat customary law and augury and way of life system form the foundation of the Iban's own identity and religion.

References 

Iban people
Malaysian culture
Indonesian culture